Fairchild House may refer to:

in the United Kingdom
Fairchild House, Hoxton, apartment block in London
Fairchild House, Pimlico, apartment block in London

in the United States
(by state)
Fairchild House (Monticello, Kentucky), listed on the National Register of Historic Places in Kentucky
Fairchild Mansion, Oneonta, New York, listed on the NRHP in New York 
Fairchild House (Syracuse, New York), listed on the NRHP in New York

See also
 Fairchild (disambiguation)